Salix magnifica is a species of willow in the family Salicaceae. It is endemic to Sichuan in southwestern China, where it grows at high altitudes of 2,100–3,000 m above sea level. It is threatened by habitat loss.

The leaves are alternate, 10–25 cm long and 7–12 cm broad, with an entire margin; they are green above, and glaucous below, with red veins and petiole. The flowers are produced in catkins in late spring after the new leaves appear; it is dioecious, with male and female catkins on separate plants. The male catkins are 10 cm long; the female catkins are 10 cm long at pollination, expanding to 25 cm long at seed maturity.

The three varieties are:
Salix magnifica var. magnifica
Salix magnifica var. apatela (C.K.Schneider) K.S.Hao
Salix magnifica var. ulotricha (C.K.Schneider) N.Chao

It is cultivated as an ornamental plant in western Europe for its bold foliage, with the largest leaves of any willow.

References

magnifica
Flora of China
Vulnerable plants
Taxonomy articles created by Polbot